The Nash House is a historic house at 601 Rock Street in Little Rock, Arkansas.  It is a two-story wood-frame structure, with a side-gable roof and clapboard siding. A two-story gabled section projects on the right side of the main facade, and the left side has a two-story flat-roof porch, with large fluted Ionic columns supporting an entablature and dentillated and modillioned eave.  Designed by Charles L. Thompson and built in 1907, it is a fine example of a modestly scaled Colonial Revival property.  Another house that Thompson designed for Walter Nash stands nearby.

The house was listed on the National Register of Historic Places in 1982.

See also
Nash House (409 East 6th Street, Little Rock, Arkansas)
National Register of Historic Places listings in Little Rock, Arkansas

References

Houses on the National Register of Historic Places in Arkansas
Colonial Revival architecture in Arkansas
Houses completed in 1907
Houses in Little Rock, Arkansas
National Register of Historic Places in Little Rock, Arkansas
Historic district contributing properties in Arkansas